For the Relief of Unbearable Urges is a short story collection by Nathan Englander, first published by Knopf in 1999. It has received many positive reviews. It earned Englander a PEN/Malamud Award and the Sue Kaufman Prize for First Fiction, as well as being a finalist for the 1999 Art Seidenbaum Award for First Fiction.

The collection contains nine stories, many of which are set in the Jewish Orthodox world. The title story tells of a married Hasidic Jew who receives special dispensation from a rabbi to visit a prostitute – "for the relief of unbearable urges." The story "The Twenty-seventh Man", about Yiddish writers killed by Stalin, is an allusion to the Night of the Murdered Poets.

Contents
 "The Twenty-seventh Man"
 "The Tumblers"
 "Reunion"
 "The Wig"
 "The Gilgul of Park Avenue"
 "Reb Kringle"
 "The Last One Way"
 "For the Relief of Unbearable Urges"
 "In This Way We Are Wise"

References

1999 short story collections
Jewish American short story collections